Waratah was an electoral district of the Legislative Assembly in the Australian state of New South Wales in the Newcastle area, including the suburb of Waratah. It was originally created in 1894, when multi-member districts were abolished, and the three member district of Newcastle was divided between Waratah, Newcastle East, Newcastle West, Kahibah and Wickham. The district was abolished in 1913 and recreated in 1930, replacing parts of Kahibah and Wallsend. It was abolished again in 1999.

Members for Waratah

Election results

References

Former electoral districts of New South Wales
Constituencies established in 1894
1894 establishments in Australia
Constituencies disestablished in 1913
1913 disestablishments in Australia
Constituencies established in 1930
1930 establishments in Australia
Constituencies disestablished in 1999
1999 disestablishments in Australia